Maquilla may refer to:
Maquinna, a chief of the Nuu-chah-nulth people
Maquilla Peak, a mountain in Canada